This is a list of foreign ministers in 2003.

Africa
 Algeria - Abdelaziz Belkhadem (2000-2005)
 Angola - João Bernardo de Miranda (1999-2008)
 Benin -
 Antoine Idji Kolawolé (1998-2003)
 Joseph Gnonlonfoun (acting) (2003)
 Rogatien Biaou (2003-2006)
 Botswana - Mompati Merafhe (1994-2008)
 Burkina Faso - Youssouf Ouedraogo (1999-2007)
 Burundi - Terence Sinunguruza (2001-2005)
 Cameroon - François Xavier Ngoubeyou (2001-2004)
 Cape Verde - Fátima Veiga (2002-2004)
 Central African Republic -
 Agba Otikpo Mézodé (2001-2003)
 Martial Beti Marace (2003)
 Karim Meckassoua (2003)
 Charles Wénézoui (2003-2005)
 Chad -
 Mahamat Saleh Annadif (1997-2003)
 Nagoum Yamassoum (2003-2005)
 Comoros - Mohamed El-Amine Souef (2002-2005)
 Republic of Congo - Rodolphe Adada (1997-2007)
 Democratic Republic of Congo -
 Léonard She Okitundu (2000-2003)
 Antoine Ghonda (2003-2004)
 Côte d'Ivoire -
 Abou Drahamane Sangare (2000-2003)
 Bamba Mamadou (2003-2006)
 Djibouti - Ali Abdi Farah (1999-2005)
 Egypt - Ahmed Maher (2001-2004)
 Equatorial Guinea -
 Santiago Nsobeya Efuman (1999-2003)
 Pastor Micha Ondó Bile (2003-2012)
 Eritrea - Ali Said Abdella (2000-2005)
 Ethiopia - Seyoum Mesfin (1991-2010)
 Gabon - Jean Ping (1999-2008)
 The Gambia - Baboucarr-Blaise Jagne (2001-2004)
 Ghana -
 Hackman Owusu-Agyeman (2001-2003)
 Nana Akufo-Addo (2003-2007)
 Guinea - François Lonseny Fall (2002-2004)
 Guinea-Bissau -
 Joãozinho Vieira Có (2002-2003)
 Fatumata Djau Baldé (2003)
 João José Monteiro (2003-2004)
 Kenya -
 Marsden Madoka (2001-2003)
 Kalonzo Musyoka (2003-2004)
 Lesotho - Mohlabi Tsekoa (2002-2004)
 Liberia -
 Monie Captan (1996-2003)
 Lewis Brown (2003)
 Thomas Nimely (2003-2006)
 Libya - Abdel Rahman Shalgham (2000-2009)
 Madagascar - Marcel Ranjeva (2002-2009)
 Malawi - Lilian Patel (2000-2004)
 Mali - Lassana Traoré (2002-2004)
 Mauritania -
 Mohamed Ould Tolba (2002-2003)
 Mohamed Vall Ould Bellal (2003-2005)
 Mauritius -
 Anil Gayan (2000-2003)
 Jaya Krishna Cuttaree (2003-2005)
 Morocco - Mohamed Benaissa (1999-2007)
 Western Sahara - Mohamed Salem Ould Salek (1998–2023)
 Mozambique - Leonardo Simão (1994-2005)
 Namibia - Hidipo Hamutenya (2002-2004)
 Niger - Aïchatou Mindaoudou (2001-2010)
 Nigeria -
 Sule Lamido (2000-2003)
 Oluyemi Adeniji (2003-2006)
 Rwanda - Charles Murigande (2002-2008)
 São Tomé and Príncipe - Mateus Meira Rita (2002-2004)
 Senegal - Cheikh Tidiane Gadio (2000-2009)
 Seychelles - Jérémie Bonnelame (1997-2005)
 Sierra Leone - Momodu Koroma (2002-2007)
 Somalia - Yusuf Hassan Ibrahim (2002-2004)
 Somaliland -
 Mohamed Said Gees (2002-2003)
 Edna Adan Ismail (2003-2006)
 South Africa - Nkosazana Dlamini-Zuma (1999-2009)
 Sudan - Mustafa Osman Ismail (1998-2005)
 Swaziland -
 Abednego Ntshangase (2001-2003)
 Roy Fanourakis (2003)
 Mabili Dlamini (2003-2006)
 Tanzania - Jakaya Kikwete (1995-2006)
 Togo -
 Roland Kpotsra (2002-2003)
 Kokou Tozoun (2003-2005)
 Tunisia - Habib Ben Yahia (1999-2004)
 Uganda - James Wapakhabulo (2001-2004)
 Zambia - Kalombo Mwansa (2002-2005)
 Zimbabwe - Stan Mudenge (1995-2005)

Asia
 Afghanistan - Abdullah Abdullah (2001-2006)
 Armenia - Vartan Oskanian (1998-2008)
 Azerbaijan - Vilayat Guliyev (1999-2004)
 Nagorno-Karabakh - Ashot Gulyan (2002-2004)
 Bahrain - Sheikh Muhammad ibn Mubarak ibn Hamad Al Khalifah (1971-2005)
 Bangladesh - Morshed Khan (2001-2006)
 Bhutan -
 Jigme Thinley (1998-2003)
 Khandu Wangchuk (2003-2007)
 Brunei - Pengiran Muda Mohamed Bolkiah (1984–2015)
 Cambodia - Hor Namhong (1998–2016)
 China -
 Tang Jiaxuan (1998-2003)
 Li Zhaoxing (2003-2007)
 East Timor - José Ramos-Horta (2000-2006)
 Georgia -
 Irakli Menagarishvili (1995-2003)
 Merab Antadze (acting) (2003)
 Tedo Japaridze (2003-2004)
 Abkhazia - Sergei Shamba (1997-2004)
 South Ossetia - Murat Dzhioyev (1998-2012)
 India - Yashwant Sinha (2002-2004)
 Indonesia - Hassan Wirajuda (2001-2009)
 Iran - Kamal Kharazi (1997-2005)
 Iraq -
 Naji Sabri (2001-2003)
 Muhammad Amin Ahmad (2003)
 Hoshyar Zebari (2003–2014)
 Israel -
 Benjamin Netanyahu (2002-2003)
 Silvan Shalom (2003-2006)
 Palestinian Authority - Nabil Shaath (2003-2005)
 Japan - Yoriko Kawaguchi (2002-2004)
 Jordan - Marwan al-Muasher (2002-2004)
 Kazakhstan - Kassym-Jomart Tokayev (2002-2007)
 North Korea - Paek Nam-sun (1998-2007)
 South Korea -
 Choi Sung Hong (2002-2003)
 Yoon Young-kwan (2003-2004)
 Kuwait -
 Sheikh Sabah Al-Ahmad Al-Jaber Al-Sabah (1978-2003)
 Sheikh Mohammad Sabah Al-Salem Al-Sabah (2003-2011)
 Kyrgyzstan - Askar Aitmatov (2002-2005)
 Laos - Somsavat Lengsavad (1993-2006)
 Lebanon -
 Mahmoud Hammoud (2000-2003)
 Jean Obeid (2003-2004)
 Malaysia - Syed Hamid Albar (1999-2008)
 Maldives - Fathulla Jameel (1978-2005)
 Mongolia - Luvsangiin Erdenechuluun (2000-2004)
 Myanmar - Win Aung (1998-2004)
 Nepal -
 Narendra Bikram Shah (2002-2003)
 Surya Bahadur Thapa (2003-2004)
 Oman - Yusuf bin Alawi bin Abdullah (1982–2020)
 Pakistan - Khurshid Mahmud Kasuri (2002-2007)
 Philippines -
 Blas Ople (2002-2003)
 Franklin Ebdalin (acting) (2003)
 Gloria Macapagal Arroyo (2003)
 Delia Albert (2003-2004)
 Qatar - Sheikh Hamad bin Jassim bin Jaber Al Thani (1992-2013)
 Saudi Arabia - Prince Saud bin Faisal bin Abdulaziz Al Saud (1975–2015)
 Singapore - S. Jayakumar (1994-2004)
 Sri Lanka - Tyronne Fernando (2001-2004)
 Syria - Farouk al-Sharaa (1984-2006)
 Taiwan - Eugene Chien (2002-2004)
 Tajikistan - Talbak Nazarov (1994-2006)
 Thailand - Surakiart Sathirathai (2001-2005)
 Turkey -
 Yaşar Yakış (2002-2003)
 Abdullah Gül (2003-2007)
 Turkmenistan - Raşit Meredow (2001–present)
 United Arab Emirates - Rashid Abdullah Al Nuaimi (1980-2006)
 Uzbekistan -
 Abdulaziz Komilov (1994-2003)
 Sodiq Safoyev (2003-2005)
 Vietnam - Nguyễn Dy Niên (2000-2006)
 Yemen - Abu Bakr al-Qirbi (2001-2014)

Australia and Oceania
 Australia - Alexander Downer (1996-2007)
 Fiji - Kaliopate Tavola (2000-2006)
 French Polynesia - Gaston Flosse (2000-2004)
 Kiribati -
 Teburoro Tito (1994-2003)
 Tion Otang (2003)
 Anote Tong (2003–2016)
 Marshall Islands - Gerald Zackios (2001-2008)
 Micronesia -
 Ieske Iehsi (2001-2003)
 David Panuelo (acting) (2003)
 Sebastian Anefal (2003-2007)
 Nauru -
 René Harris (2001-2003)
 Bernard Dowiyogo (2003)
 René Harris (2003)
 Bernard Dowiyogo (2003)
 Derog Gioura (2003)
 Ludwig Scotty (2003)
 René Harris (2003-2004)
 New Zealand - Phil Goff (1999-2005)
 Cook Islands - Robert Woonton (1999-2004)
 Niue - Young Vivian (2002-2008)
 Palau - Temmy Shmull (2001-2009)
 Papua New Guinea - Sir Rabbie Namaliu (2002-2006)
 Samoa - Tuilaepa Sailele Malielegaoi (1998–2021)
 Solomon Islands - Laurie Chan (2002-2006)
 Tonga - Prince 'Ulukalala Lavaka Ata (1998-2004)
 Tuvalu - Saufatu Sopoanga (2002-2004)
 Vanuatu -
 Serge Vohor (2002-2003)
 Moana Carcasses Kalosil (2003-2004)

Europe
 Albania -
 Ilir Meta (2001-2003)
 Luan Hajdaraga (acting) (2003)
 Kastriot Islami (2003-2005)
 Andorra - Juli Minoves Triquell (2001-2007)
 Austria - Benita Ferrero-Waldner (2000-2004)
 Belarus -
 Mikhail Khvostov (2000-2003)
 Sergei Martynov (2003-2012)
 Belgium - Louis Michel (1999-2004)
 Brussels-Capital Region - Guy Vanhengel (2000-2009)
 Flanders -
 Jaak Gabriëls (2002-2003)
 Patricia Ceysens (2003-2004)
 Bosnia and Herzegovina -
 Zlatko Lagumdžija (2001-2003)
 Mladen Ivanić (2003-2007)
 Bulgaria - Solomon Passy (2001-2005)
 Croatia -
 Tonino Picula (2000-2003)
 Miomir Žužul (2003-2005)
 Cyprus -
 Ioannis Kasoulidis (1997-2003)
 Georgios Iacovou (2003-2006)
 Northern Cyprus - Tahsin Ertuğruloğlu (1998-2004)
 Czech Republic - Cyril Svoboda (2002-2006)
 Denmark - Per Stig Møller (2001-2010)
 Greenland - Josef Motzfeldt (2003-2007)
 Estonia - Kristiina Ojuland (2002-2005)
 Finland - Erkki Tuomioja (2000-2007)
 France - Dominique de Villepin (2002-2004)
 Germany - Joschka Fischer (1998-2005)
 Greece - George Papandreou (1999-2004)
 Hungary - László Kovács (2002-2004)
 Iceland - Halldór Ásgrímsson (1995-2004)
 Ireland - Brian Cowen (2000-2004)
 Italy - Franco Frattini (2002-2004)
 Latvia - Sandra Kalniete (2002-2004)
 Liechtenstein - Ernst Walch (2001-2005)
 Lithuania - Antanas Valionis (2000-2006)
 Luxembourg - Lydie Polfer (1999-2004)
 Macedonia - Ilinka Mitreva (2002-2006)
 Malta -  Joe Borg (1999-2004)
 Moldova - Nicolae Dudău (2001-2004)
 Transnistria - Valeriy Litskai (2000-2008)
 Netherlands -
 Jaap de Hoop Scheffer (2002-2003)
 Ben Bot (2003-2007)
 Norway - Jan Petersen (2001-2005)
 Poland - Włodzimierz Cimoszewicz (2001-2005)
 Portugal -
 António Martins da Cruz (2002-2003)
 Teresa Patrício de Gouveia (2003-2004)
 Romania - Mircea Geoană (2000-2004)
 Russia - Igor Ivanov (1998-2004)
 San Marino -
 Fiorenzo Stolfi (2002-2003)
 Fabio Berardi (2003-2006)
 Serbia and Montenegro - Goran Svilanović (2000-2004)
 Montenegro -
 Dragan Đurović (acting) (2002-2003)
 Dragiša Burzan (2003-2004)
 Slovakia - Eduard Kukan (1998-2006)
 Slovenia - Dimitrij Rupel (2000-2004)
 Spain - Ana de Palacio y del Valle-Lersundi (2002-2004)
 Sweden -
 Anna Lindh (1998-2003)
 Jan O. Karlsson (acting) (2003)
 Laila Freivalds (2003-2006)
 Switzerland -
 Micheline Calmy-Rey (2003-2011)
 Ukraine -
 Anatoliy Zlenko (2000-2003)
 Kostyantyn Gryshchenko (2003-2005)
 United Kingdom - Jack Straw (2001-2006)
 Vatican City -
 Archbishop Jean-Louis Tauran (1990-2003)
 Archbishop Giovanni Lajolo (2003-2006)

North America and the Caribbean
 Antigua and Barbuda - Lester Bird (1991-2004)
 The Bahamas - Fred Mitchell (2002-2007)
 Barbados - Billie Miller (1994-2008)
 Belize -
 Assad Shoman (2002-2003)
 Godfrey Smith (2003-2006)
 Canada - Bill Graham (2002-2004)
 Quebec -
 Louise Beaudoin (1998-2003)
 Monique Gagnon-Tremblay (2003-2008)
 Costa Rica - Roberto Tovar Faja (2002-2006)
 Cuba - Felipe Pérez Roque (1999-2009)
 Dominica - Osborne Riviere (2001-2005)
 Dominican Republic -
 Hugo Tolentino Dipp (2000-2003)
 Frank Guerrero Prats (2003-2004)
 El Salvador - María Eugenia Brizuela de Ávila (1999-2004)
 Grenada - Elvin Nimrod (2000-2008)
 Guatemala - Edgar Armando Gutiérrez Girón (2002-2004)
 Haiti - Joseph Philippe Antonio (2001-2004)
 Honduras -
 Guillermo Pérez Arias (2002-2003)
 Aníbal Quiñónez (2003)
 Leonidas Rosa Bautista (2003-2005)
 Jamaica - Keith Desmond Knight (2001-2006)
 Mexico -
 Jorge Castañeda Gutman (2000-2003)
 Luis Ernesto Derbez (2003-2006)
 Nicaragua - Norman José Caldera Cardenal (2002-2007)
 Panama -
 José Miguel Alemán Healy (1999-2003)
 Harmodio Arias Cerjack (2003-2004)
 Puerto Rico –
Ferdinand Mercado (2001–2003)
Jose Izquierdo Encarnacion (2003–2005)
 Saint Kitts and Nevis - Timothy Harris (2001-2008)
 Saint Lucia - Julian Hunte (2001-2004)
 Saint Vincent and the Grenadines - Louis Straker (2001-2005)
 Trinidad and Tobago - Knowlson Gift (2001-2006)
 United States - Colin Powell (2001-2005)

South America
 Argentina -
 Carlos Ruckauf (2002-2003)
 Rafael Bielsa (2003-2005)
 Bolivia -
 Carlos Saavedra Bruno (2002-2003)
 Juan Ignacio Siles (2003-2005)
 Brazil -
 Celso Lafer (2001-2003)
 Celso Amorim (2003-2011)
 Chile - Soledad Alvear (2000-2004)
 Colombia - Carolina Barco (2002-2006)
 Ecuador -
 Heinz Moeller Freile (2000-2003)
 Nina Pacari (2003)
 Patricio Zuquilanda (2003-2005)
 Guyana - Rudy Insanally (2001-2008)
 Paraguay -
 José Antonio Moreno Ruffinelli (2001-2003)
 Leila Rachid de Cowles (2003-2006)
 Peru -
 Allan Wagner Tizón (2002-2003)
 Manuel Rodríguez Cuadros (2003-2005)
 Suriname - Marie Levens (2000-2005)
 Uruguay - Didier Opertti (1998-2005)
 Venezuela - Roy Chaderton (2002-2004)

2003
2003 in politics
2003 in international relations
Foreign ministers